Mac Faulkner (born May 20, 1983) is a Canadian former professional ice hockey centre and a partner at McKinsey & Company

Career
Faulkner played the majority of his professional career in the ECHL, playing for the Long Beach Ice Dogs, Columbia Inferno, Reading Royals and Cincinnati Cyclones. He also played nine games in the American Hockey League, five for the Binghamton Senators, three for the Toronto Marlies and one for the Norfolk Admirals.

In 2009, Faulkner moved to Europe and signed for Italian Serie A team HC Alleghe. After two seasons with Alleghe he moved to fellow Serie A team Ritten Sport. In 2012, Faulkner signed for the Cardiff Devils in the Elite Ice Hockey League in the United Kingdom where he scored 30 goals in just 38 games and was named in the EIHL's First All-Star Team. He re-signed for a second season with the Devils where he became their captain. He racked up 32 goals and 31 assists for 63 points in 52 games and was named in the EIHL's Second All-Star Team. Faulkner departed from the Devils afterwards and soon retired from professional hockey.

Following Faulkner's departure from professional hockey, he joined the management consulting firm McKinsey & Company in Toronto where he is currently a partner.

Awards and honours

References

External links

1983 births
Living people
Binghamton Senators players
Canadian ice hockey centres
Cardiff Devils players
Cincinnati Cyclones (ECHL) players
Clarkson Golden Knights men's ice hockey players
Columbia Inferno players
HC Alleghe players
Ice hockey people from Ontario
Long Beach Ice Dogs (ECHL) players
Norfolk Admirals players
Reading Royals players
Ritten Sport players
Toronto Marlies players
Canadian expatriate ice hockey players in the United States
Canadian expatriate ice hockey players in Wales
Canadian expatriate ice hockey players in Italy